Samuel Boyer Garver (August 21, 1839–September 14, 1911) was an American farmer and politician.

Garver was born in Dauphin County, Pennsylvania. In 1855, he moved to Piatt County, Illinois and was involved with farming. Garver served in the 73rd Illinois Infantry Regiment during the American Civil War and was wounded. He lived in Farmer City, Illinois and was involved with the drug business. Garver served in the Illinois House of Representatives from 1897 to 1901 and was a Republican. In 1906, Garver moved to Decatur, Illinois. Garve died in Decatur, Illinois.

Notes

1839 births
1911 deaths
People from Dauphin County, Pennsylvania
People from Decatur, Illinois
People from Farmer City, Illinois
People of Illinois in the American Civil War
Businesspeople from Illinois
Farmers from Illinois
Republican Party members of the Illinois House of Representatives